Candas is a commune in the Somme department in Hauts-de-France in northern France.

Geography

Places of interest
Fanchon's windmill 

The sails stopped turning in 1923, on the death of the last miller, Louis Fanchon (who acquired the mill in 1882). The building was left to nature, and was soon covered in moss and grass, with bushes growing through every opening. Much of the structure began to crumble.
After more than 10 years restoration, thanks to the dynamism of the 'Association de Sauvegarde du Patrimoine de Candas, the mill is now open to the public. There's a guided tour and demonstrations of flour production.

See also
Communes of the Somme department

References

External links

 Candas website 
 Visit to the mill at Candas, on the "Chez Marius" website 

Communes of Somme (department)